Grandin is an unincorporated community in Caldwell County, North Carolina, United States.

Four sites in Grandin are listed on the National Register of Historic Places: Dula-Horton Cemetery, the William Hagler House, Mariah's Chapel, and Riverside.

References

Unincorporated communities in Caldwell County, North Carolina
Unincorporated communities in North Carolina